Helliker is a surname. Notable people with the surname include:

 Adam Helliker (born 20th century), English journalist
 Kevin Helliker (born 1959), American journalist
 Thomas Helliker (1784–1807), English mill worker who was hanged